Siviya is a village in the  North-East District of Botswana. The population in 2001 was 1,285. The population in 2011 was 1,288.

References

Villages in Botswana
North-East District (Botswana)